The Rape of Europa: The Fate of Europe's Treasures in the Third Reich and the Second World War is a 1994 book by Lynn H. Nicholas and a 2006 documentary film. The book explores the Nazi plunder of looted art treasures from occupied countries and the consequences. It covers a range of associated activities: Nazi appropriation and storage, patriotic concealment and smuggling during World War II, discoveries by the Allies, and the extraordinary tasks of preserving, tracking, and returning by the American Monuments officers and their colleagues. Nicholas was awarded the Légion d'Honneur by France.

Despite the regular accounts of impending destruction of art works, Nicholas also recounts a veneration for art on the part of people of all sides of the conflict, and what amounts to desperate and sometimes heroic activity. The villains, unsurprisingly, are often the Nazis, particularly Adolf Hitler and Hermann Göring; the activities of Western art dealers are often questionable, as well.

Contents
The book is chronological, starting with scattered events in the decade before World War II. During this time, the Nazis used their influence and money to acquire artwork, while dealers and the public at large were anticipating war. Discussion of Nazi occupation starts in the third chapter. The middle of the book discusses Nazi plundering during the war, as well as Soviet efforts to safeguard their treasures. Midway through the book, the role of American and Allied organizations is introduced, including the frustratingly tentative planning and lack of resources they faced. The book follows the path of liberation as the Allies push back the Axis, while missing art is searched for and recovered art conserved. The book concludes with chapters about post war activities: resolving problems of ownership, coordinating the return of stolen art, and attempting to collect what was yet missing. Philosophically intriguing are issues of who ultimately owns works of art. Since this last phase of recovery and restitution is ongoing, this book has a bearing on current activities.

Awards
The book won the National Book Critics Circle Award for general non-fiction in 1994.

Documentary

The Rape of Europa was adapted for a 2006 film of the same name. It was made for 1.3 million USD, with half underwritten by the National Endowment for the Humanities and the remainder underwritten by the National Endowment for the Arts, several other foundations, and one private investor.

Among the featured vignettes in the film is Jewish refugee Maria Altmann, who in 2006 restituted Gustav Klimt's 1907 masterpiece Portrait of Adele Bloch-Bauer I. Altmann was portrayed by Helen Mirren in the 2015 film Woman in Gold.

Richard Berge, Nicole Newnham, and Bonni Cohen were nominated for the Writers Guild of America Award for Best Documentary Screenplay for The Rape of Europa.

See also
 Art theft and looting during World War II
 Monuments Men Foundation for the Preservation of Art
 Monuments, Fine Arts, and Archives program
 The Monuments Men, 2014 film
 Old Masters
 Portrait of a Young Man (Raphael)
 Maria Altmann
 Adele Bloch-Bauer
 Deane Keller
 Rescuing Da Vinci

References

External links
 
 
 Film official site; PBS (Oregon Public Broadcasting): The Rape of Europa, 2006 film, aired November 24, 2008
 Rescuing DaVinci, companion book to the film
 Google Books preview of The Rape of Europa

1994 non-fiction books
2006 films
American documentary films
Art and cultural repatriation after World War II
Documentary films about Nazi Germany
Documentary films about the visual arts
Looting
National Book Critics Circle Award-winning works
2000s English-language films
2000s American films